Encheloclarias prolatus is a species of airbreathing catfish endemic to Malaysia where it is only found in western Sarawak on the island of Borneo.  This species reaches a length of 8.6 cm (3.4 inches) SL.

References
 

Endemic fauna of Malaysia
Freshwater fish of Malaysia
Encheloclarias
Fish described in 1993
Taxonomy articles created by Polbot